Lobacheve is a village in Shchastia Raion (district) in Luhansk Oblast of eastern Ukraine, on the left bank of Siverskyi Donets.

The War in Donbas, that started in mid-April 2014, has brought along both civilian and military casualties. Two Ukrainian servicemen were killed and six wounded near the village in an ambush on 2 September 2015. One Ukrainian serviceman was wounded on 27 February 2017.

References

Villages in Shchastia Raion
Populated places established in 1700